Canadian Science Publishing (CSP) is Canada's largest publisher of international scientific journals. It started in 1929 as the NRC Research Press, part of the National Research Council (NRC). In 2010, the organization spun off from NRC and was incorporated as a not-for-profit.  

As of 2018, CSP has published about 2,300 articles annually in 24 journals distributed to over 125 countries. CSP has 50 staff members, and, according to the website Owler, its annual revenue is about US$3.7M.  All of CSP's journals are produced and delivered in both HTML and PDF formats, is connected to scientific literature, included in all major indexes, and archived through both CLOCKSS and Portico.

Open access 
CSP has an OpenArticle program, which permits authors and/or research funding agencies to sponsor online open access of their article.  It also has auto-deposit of accepted manuscripts into the University of Toronto TSpace, a free and secure research repository; and an adoption of a Creative Commons CC BY.  

CSP publishes three interdisciplinary open access journals: Arctic Science, a journal that focuses on research about northern polar regions; FACETS, Canada’s first open access multidisciplinary science journal;, and Anthropocene Coasts. 

CSP also provides the CSP blog, which includes plain language summaries of featured research. FACETS also publishes plain language summaries.

Publications 

CSP publishes the following journals:

 Anthropocene Coasts: focuses on issues related to coastal regions in the Anthropocene.
 Applied Physiology, Nutrition, and Metabolism
 Arctic Science: publishes original peer-reviewed research from all areas of natural science and applied science and engineering related to northern Polar Regions.
 Biochemistry and Cell Biology 
 Botany
 Canadian Geotechnical Journal
 Canadian Journal of Animal Science: contains research on animal agriculture and animal products, including breeding and genetics; cellular and molecular biology; growth and development; meat science; modelling animal systems; physiology and endocrinology; ruminant nutrition; non-ruminant nutrition; and welfare, behaviour, and management
 Canadian Journal of Chemistry
 Canadian Journal of Civil Engineering
 Canadian Journal of Earth Sciences
 Canadian Journal of Fisheries and Aquatic Sciences: publishes  research on -omics, cells, organisms, populations, ecosystems, or processes that affect aquatic systems.
 Canadian Journal of Forest Research
 Canadian Journal of Microbiology
 Canadian Journal of Physics
 Canadian Journal of Physiology and Pharmacology
 Canadian Journal of Plant Science: contains research on plant science relevant to continental climate agriculture, including plant production and management, horticulture, and pest management
 Canadian Journal of Soil Science: contains research on soil science, including use, management, properties, and development of soils.
 Canadian Journal of Zoology
 Environmental Reviews: presents authoritative literature reviews on environmental science and associated environmental studies topics, with emphasis on the effects on and response of both natural and manmade ecosystems to anthropogenic stress.
 FACETS: Canada’s first multidisciplinary open access science journal
 Genome
 Geomatica
Journal of Unmanned Vehicle Systems: focuses on the field of unmanned vehicle systems and their sensors.
 Transactions of the Canadian Society for Mechanical Engineering: features research articles and notes in mechanical engineering.

References

External links 
Canadian Science Publishing
University of Toronto TSpace
Commons CC BY 

Publishing companies of Canada
National Research Council (Canada)
Non-profit academic publishers
Publishing companies established in 1929
1929 establishments in Ontario
Academic publishing companies
Canadian companies established in 1929